The 1946 Wayne Tartars football team represented Wayne University (later renamed Wayne State University) in the Mid-America Conference (MAC) during the 1946 college football season. Under first-year head coach John P. Hackett, the team compiled a 4–5 record.

Schedule

References

Wayne
Wayne State Warriors football seasons
Wayne Tartars football